Fairfax is a town in Allendale and Hampton counties, South Carolina, United States. The population was 2,025 at the 2010 census, a decline of over one-third of its population of 3,206 from 2000.

History
The Virginia Durant Young House was added to the National Register of Historic Places in 1983.

Geography
Fairfax is located at  (32.957633, -81.237794).

Demographics

2020 census

As of the 2020 United States census, there were 1,505 people, 793 households, and 497 families residing in the town.

2000 census
As of the census of 2000, there were 3,206 people, 845 households, and 549 families residing in the town. The population density was 965.8 people per square mile (372.8/km2). There were 948 housing units at an average density of 285.6 per square mile (110.2/km2). The racial makeup of the town was 25.73% White, 73.46% African American, 0.12% Native American, 0.12% Asian, 0.37% from other races, and 0.19% from two or more races. Hispanic or Latino of any race were 0.34% of the population.

There were 845 households, out of which 29.8% had children under the age of 18 living with them, 30.1% were married couples living together, 29.5% had a female householder with no husband present, and 35.0% were non-families. 32.9% of all households were made up of individuals, and 14.7% had someone living alone who was 65 years of age or older. The average household size was 2.46 and the average family size was 3.13.

The town's population was spread out, with 18.8% under the age of 18, 12.4% from 18 to 24, 37.0% from 25 to 44, 20.4% from 45 to 64, and 11.3% who were 65 years of age or older. The median age was 35 years. For every 100 females, there were 180.2 males. For every 100 females age 18 and over, there were 195.2 males.

The median income for a household in the town was $17,083, and the median income for a family was $26,097. Males had a median income of $26,759 versus $19,471 for females. The per capita income for the town was $8,940. About 26.4% of families and 37.8% of the population were below the poverty line, including 49.8% of those under age 18 and 26.9% of those age 65 or over.

References

External links

Information on the Town of Fairfax from Allendale County

Towns in Allendale County, South Carolina
Towns in South Carolina